Inger Johansdatter Oxe (c. 1526 - 1591) was a Danish noblewoman and court official. She was Hofmesterinde to the Danish Queen Sophie of Mecklenburg-Güstrow. 

She was the sister to Peder Oxe Steward of the Realm, daughter of Johan Johansen Oxe and Mette Mogensdatter Gøye, and wife of Jørgen Tygesen Brahe. She was the foster mother of the Danish astronomer Tycho Brahe whom she raised as her own son.

References

1526 births
1591 deaths
16th-century Danish nobility
Court of Frederick II of Denmark
Danish ladies-in-waiting
16th-century Danish women landowners
16th-century Danish landowners
Oxe family